Cynthia "Cindy" Hiner is an American politician and a former Democratic member of the Montana House of Representatives, who representing District 85.

References

1970 births
21st-century American politicians
Living people
People from Deer Lodge, Montana
Members of the Montana House of Representatives
Women state legislators in Montana
21st-century American women politicians